Zuzana Žirková (born June 6, 1980) is a former Slovak professional basketball player who last played for the Good Angels Košice in 2018. Since 2018–2019 season she is coaching Young Angels Košice team in Slovak extraliga. She was selected 21st overall by the Washington Mystics in the 2003 WNBA Draft.

Biography
Zuzana Žirková was born on June 6, 1980 in Bojnice, Slovakia. She grown up in Prievidza, where she started to play basketball at local elementary school.

During her career she played for several Euroleague teams including SCP Ružomberok, GYSEV Ringa Šopron, Gambrinus SIKA Brno, UMMC Ekaterinburg and Good Angels Košice. She also played in WNBA for Washington Mystics.

Honours
8x Slovak basketball Player of the year award (2003, 2005, 2007, 2008, 2009, 2010, 2014, 2015)
3x Euroleague Champion (1999, 2000, 2006)
Top Scorer FIBA Europe Under-20 Championship for Women (2000)

National basketball
She debuted at FIBA World Championship for Women in 1998 when she was only seventeen years old.
In July 2011 she announced her retirement from Slovak National Basketball Team.

WNBA
In the 2003 WNBA Draft, the Washington Mystics selected point guard Zuzana Žirková with the 2nd pick, from 21st place overall.

Career statistics

WNBA

Regular season

|-
| align="left" | 2003
| align="left" | Washington
| 6 || 0 || 5.0 || .500 || .500 || 1.000 || 0.3 || 0.2 || 0.0 || 0.0 || 0.3 || 1.8

References

External links
EuroLeague Player Profile

1980 births
Living people
Basketball players at the 2000 Summer Olympics
Olympic basketball players of Slovakia
Slovak women's basketball players
Washington Mystics players
Shooting guards
Slovak expatriate basketball people in the Czech Republic
Slovak expatriate basketball people in Hungary
Slovak expatriate basketball people in the United States
Slovak expatriate basketball people in Russia
Sportspeople from Bojnice